Alexander Keith McClung (14 June 1811 – 23 March 1855) was an attorney from Vicksburg, Mississippi, who briefly served as US chargé d'affaires to Bolivia in President Zachary Taylor's administration. An "inveterate Southern duelist" nicknamed "The Black Knight of the South", he killed as many as fourteen men in duels during his life. He was also a poet. James H. Street used him as the model for the character Keith Alexander in his novel Tap Roots (1942).

McClung was born in Fauquier County, Virginia, and was the nephew of United States Chief Justice John Marshall. He served as lieutenant colonel of the 1st Mississippi Regiment during the Mexican–American War. He was widely despised for his ill manners, bad credit, gambling, and drunkenness.  He committed suicide in the Eagle Hotel in Jackson, Mississippi.  McClung was interred at Cedar Hill Cemetery in Vicksburg, Mississippi.

Notes

References

External links
Alexander Keith McClung entry at The Political Graveyard
  (born 1811) and also here (born 1809)

1811 births
1855 deaths
19th-century American diplomats
Ambassadors of the United States to Bolivia
American military personnel of the Mexican–American War
American duellists
People from Fauquier County, Virginia
Suicides in Mississippi
United States Army colonels
Writers from Mississippi
1850s suicides